Bogdan ( 1407–26), was a Serbian magnate (velikaš) in the service of Despot Stefan Lazarević (r. 1402–27), with the title of protovestijar (financial manager). He was the ktetor (donator) of Kalenić monastery, built in 1407–13. He is mentioned in 1426 alongside veliki vojvoda Radoslav, čelnik Radič and logotet Voihna. He had a brother, Petar. His wife was named Milica.

See also
Bogdan (d. 1252), Prince of Hum (fl. 1249)
Bogdan (fl. 1363), kaznac in the service of Emperor Uroš V
Bogdan Kirizmić (fl. 1361–71), protovestijar in the service of King Vukašin
Bogdan (fl. 1407), logothete in the service of Despot Stefan
Bogdan, chancellor in the service of Despot Đurađ Branković

References

Sources

14th-century births
15th-century deaths
15th-century Serbian nobility
People of the Serbian Despotate
Economy of Serbia in the Middle Ages
Protovestiarioi
Medieval Serbian magnates